The Johns Hopkins–Loyola lacrosse rivalry is an intercollegiate lacrosse rivalry between Baltimore City's Johns Hopkins Blue Jays and Loyola Greyhounds. The teams first met in 1939, when Hopkins prevailed with a score of 20–1.

The series is known as both the "Charles Street Massacre" and the "Battle of Charles Street," depending on the school. Hopkins fans use the term "Charles Street Massacre" to refer to the historically lopsided on-field results and its continued dominance in the series. Loyola fans and some media outlets refer to the game using the more neutral sounding "Battle of Charles Street." Johns Hopkins won 31 straight meetings until Loyola finally snapped the streak with a victory of its own in 1994. Both schools' campuses are located adjacent to Charles Street, which runs north-to-south through the city of Baltimore. Both teams maintain similar cross-street series with the Towson Tigers (see Loyola–Towson lacrosse rivalry).

After the Blue Jays' 29th consecutive victory in 1969, Loyola dropped Hopkins from its schedule. Loyola was an NCAA Division II program from 1973 to 1982 when it moved to I, while Johns Hopkins was Division I during that period.  Subsequently, there was a 24-year hiatus in the series before its renewal in 1992. The Baltimore Sun asserted that in the later years before its revival, Johns Hopkins wished to avoid Loyola, as its team had grown significantly more competitive.

After its first victory in 1994, Loyola won again in 1998 and 1999. All three Loyola wins came under the guidance of head coach Dave Cottle. In the 1998 game, the Greyhounds set a school record of eleven consecutive wins by beating Johns Hopkins. Loyola (#1) entered the contest on April 28, 2012 ranked ahead of Hopkins (#10), but lost a 10–9 overtime decision at the Ridley Athletic Complex. This loss was the Greyhounds' only blemish on its first-ever national championship season.

Rival Accomplishments
The following summarizes the accomplishments of the two programs.

Loyola's 1979 and 1981 NCAA tournament appearances came at the Division II level.

Game Results

References

College lacrosse rivalries in the United States
Loyola
Loyola Greyhounds men's lacrosse
1939 establishments in Maryland